Nicolas de Largillière (10 October 1656 – 20 March 1746) was a French portrait painter, born in Paris.

Biography

Early life
Largillière's father, a merchant, took him to Antwerp at the age of three. As a boy, he spent nearly two years in London. Sometime after his return to Antwerp, a failed attempt at business led him to the studio of Anton Goubau. However, Largillière left at the age of eighteen and went to England, where he was befriended and employed by Sir Peter Lely for four years at Windsor, Berkshire.

Painting career

Early career

His painting caught the attention of Charles II, who wished to retain Largillière in his service, but the controversy aroused by the Rye House Plot against Roman Catholics alarmed Largillière. Largillière left for Paris, where he was well received by the public as a painter.

Upon ascending to the throne in 1685, James II requested Largillière to return to England. James II offered Largillière the office of keeper of the royal collections, but he declined due to being uneasy about Rye House Plot. However, during a short stay in London, he painted portraits of the king, the queen Mary of Modena, and the prince of Wales James Francis Edward Stuart. The portrait of the Prince of Wales could not have been painted during Largillière's stay in London because the prince was not born until 1688. The three portraits painted by Largillière of the prince in his youth must have been executed in Paris, where he returned sometime before March 1686. The portrait of King James II was painted in 1686. King James is portrayed in golden armor with a white cravat and is positioned in front of a watercolour-like background set in a round frame.

French Academy
In Paris, during the year 1686, Largillière produced a portrait of the painter Charles Le Brun for admittance to the French Academy. The portrait shows Le Brun, then the chairman of the academy, at work on an entombment, surrounded by classical busts and figurines scattered upon the floor and table within the picture. Le Brun, impressed by Largillière's portrait, accepted him to the academy. In 1690, Largillière was documented by the French Academy as a historical painter, which was a prominent artistic trend of the academy until the introduction of Édouard Manet.

In 1693, Largillière painted the Governor of Arras, Pierre de Montesquiou, to celebrate his promotion to brigadier in 1691.

In 1694, Largillière's made a multi-figure work that is displayed in the church of Saint-Étienne-du-Mont.

In 1709, Largillière painted the royal family portrait of The Family of Louis XIV. This portrait shows King Louis XIV, Madame de Ventadour (governess of the children of the Duke of Burgundy), the 3-year old Louis, Duke of Brittany (1707–1712), Louis, Grand Dauphin and Louis, Duke of Burgundy, future dauphin. The King displays a sense of slight uneasiness unlike the other figures especially. In the painting, Largillière used the Renaissance technique of structured disposition.

A year later, Largillière painted a self-portrait which also contained two female members of his family.

Later career

Towards the end of his life, Largillière painted a repetition of anonymous male portraits of Parisian nobles. One example was painted in 1710, of a man standing with spread fingers that conceal a letter held in the other hand. Another portrait from about 1715 shows a frontal three quarter view of a man dressed in similar clothes and wig with a Doric column in the background.

In 1714, Largillière painted King Augustus II of Poland. Largillière also painted the artist Jacques-Antoine Arlaud in a red robe in a similar fashion to Largillière's portrait of the painter Charles Le Brun, as well as the sculptor Nicolas Couston. Around the next year, Largillière painted The Study of Different Types of Hands, which currently resides in the Louvre.

In 1718, Largillière painted the French poet and essayist Voltaire.

The Entry of Christ into Jerusalem was a landscape painting that Largillière painted in 1720.

Largillière made his last self-portrait in 1725. This portrait displays the artist at his easel staring toward the audience.

Largillière was appointed as chancellor of the French Academy in 1743.

Death
Nicolas de Largillière died on 20 March 1746 at the age of 89. Upon his death, he donated to France several small landscapes and still life pictures he had created.

Legacy
The Ashmolean Museum (University of Oxford), the Fitzwilliam Museum (University of Cambridge), the Honolulu Museum of Art, the Louvre, the National Gallery of Art (Washington D.C.), the Nelson-Atkins Museum of Art (Kansas City, Missouri), the Musée des Beaux-Arts de Strasbourg and Pinacoteca di Brera (Milan), Calouste Gulbenkian Museum, Museu Nacional de Arte Antiga (Lisbon), Museum de Fundatie (Zwolle),  the Detroit Institute of Arts (Detroit) and the Speed Art Museum (Louisville) are among the public collections holding works by Nicolas de Largillière.

Jean-Baptiste Oudry and Jacob van Schuppen, Largillière's pupil and nephew respectively, were also rococo painters.

Gallery

References

Attribution

1656 births
1746 deaths
17th-century French painters
18th-century French painters
French male painters
French portrait painters
Orientalist painters
Painters from Paris
18th-century French male artists